Stuart Bale (born 21 January 1964) is a male former tennis player from England.

Bale represented his native country in the singles competition at the 1984 Summer Olympics in Los Angeles. He was eliminated in the second round there.

Bale's highest ranking in singles was World No. 202, which he reached in May 1985.  His highest doubles ranking was World No. 256, which he reached in November 1984.

Bale made five appearances in the Wimbledon singles draw, making it to the second round in 1983 and 1984, and played in one Australian Open singles draw, losing in the first round in 1985.  Partnering Brett Steven, Bale made it to the quarterfinals in the doubles draw at Wimbledon in 1994.

External links
 
 

1964 births
Living people
English male tennis players
Olympic tennis players of Great Britain
Tennis players at the 1984 Summer Olympics
British male tennis players
Tennis people from Greater London